The province of Forlì-Cesena is a province in the Emilia–Romagna region of Italy. Its capital is the city  of Forlì. It contains 30 comuni and the provincial president is Davide Drei. Although located close to the independent Republic of San Marino, Forlì-Cesena does not share a land border with the sovereign state.

History
Forlì was founded by the Roman consul Marcus Livius Salinator, and it was connected to the Via Aemilia in 188 BCE. By the 12th century CE, it had become a Ghibelline commune and military garrison. The Holy See initiated a small attempt to rule Forlì in 1278, but the family of Ordelaffi led the city from 1315 until 1480. The city was later governed by Girolamo Riario and his wife, Caterina Sforza; during this period, the Holy See attempted to regain control but was unsuccessful. Spanish Pope Alexander VI ordered his son Cesare Borgia, Duke of Valentinois, to Forlì and other communes in the region; Borgia successfully gained control of Forlì in 1500, but lost it in 1503, after the death of Alexander VI. Until the formation of the Kingdom of Italy, it remained under the rule of the Holy See.

Cesena was first owned by the Romans until the fall of Rome when it was taken by the Byzantine Empire. Following this, it was owned by archbishops of Ravenna. During the period of issues between the Guelphs and Ghibellines, the Holy See took over Cesena from the Ordelaffis. Antipope Clement VII's troops almost completely destroyed Cesena in 1377, and the Pope gave the city to the House of Malatesta. After the House of Malatesta controlled the city from 1378 to 1465, the Holy See regained control of Cesena. Leonardo da Vinci designed the port Cesenatico. It remained under papal rule until Italy was unified.

In 1921, there was a rapid advance of the Fascist movement in the region triggered by issues connected with agrarian reform. Buildings belonging to the republicans and socialists were seized or burnt down by Italo Balbo, and on July 29, he and his men moved throughout the provinces of Ravenna and Forlì, burning every socialist organisation headquarters in a night of terror which was later called the "column of fire". This was a pivotal moment in the advance of Fascism in northern Italy.

Geography
The province of Forlì-Cesena is one of nine provinces in the region of Emilia-Romagna in the northeast of Italy. Along with that of Rimini, it is the most southerly of the provinces in the region and it abuts onto the Adriatic Sea for a short distance. The Province of Ravenna lies immediately to the north and the Province of Mantua in Lombardy to the northwest. To the west lies the Metropolitan City of Florence in the region of Tuscany, the Province of Arezzo, also in Tuscany, lies to the south, and the Province of Rimini lies to the southeast.

Twin cities
 
 Beijing-Dongcheng District, China, since 2012

References

External links
Official website 
Tourism portal for Provincia di Forlì-Cesena

 
Forli-Cesena